The Hugo Ross Trophy was named after a Winnipeg real estate broker, Hugo Ross, who donated the championship trophy to the Western Canada Rugby Football Union (WCRFU).

When the WCRFU joined with the Canadian Rugby Union in 1921, the Hugo Ross Trophy champion were able to play for the Grey Cup against teams outside Western Canada. In 1935, the Winnipeg Pegs became the only WCRFU team to win the Grey Cup.

By 1936, the Hugo Ross Trophy was awarded to the champion of the Western Interprovincial Football Union (WIFU). The winner of the trophy usually ended up playing against the IRFU champions for the Grey Cup. The Hugo Ross Trophy was awarded to the WIFU champion from 1936 to 1947.

In the 1948 season, the Hugo Ross Trophy was replaced by the N. J. Taylor Trophy as the official WIFU trophy. The N. J. Taylor Trophy was awarded to the CFL West Division champions until 2003.

Hugo Ross Trophy winners 
 1947 - Winnipeg Blue Bombers
 1946 - Winnipeg Blue Bombers
 1945 - Winnipeg Blue Bombers +3
 1944 - not awarded due to World War II
 1943 - not awarded due to World War II
 1942 - not awarded due to World War II
 1941 - Winnipeg Blue Bombers
 1940 - Winnipeg Blue Bombers +2
 1939 - Winnipeg Blue Bombers
 1938 - Winnipeg Blue Bombers
 1937 - Winnipeg Blue Bombers
 1936 - Regina Roughriders +1
 1935 - Winnipeg 'Pegs
 1934 - Regina Roughriders
 1933 - Winnipeg 'Pegs
 1932 - Regina Roughriders
 1931 - Regina Roughriders
 1930 - Regina Roughriders
 1929 - Regina Roughriders
 1928 - Regina Roughriders
 1927 - Regina Roughriders
 1926 - Regina Roughriders 
 1925 - Winnipeg Tammany Tigers 
 1924 - Winnipeg Tammany Tigers
 1923 - Regina Rugby Club
 1922 - Edmonton Eskimos
 1921 - Edmonton Eskimos
 1920 - Regina Rugby Club 
 1919 - Regina Rugby Club 
 1918 - not awarded due to World War I
 1917 - not awarded due to World War I
 1916 - not awarded due to World War I
 1915 - Regina Rugby Club
 1914 - Regina Rugby Club
 1913 - Regina Rugby Club 
 1912 - Regina Rugby Club 
 1911 - Calgary Tigers

+1 - Regina Rugby Club did not play in the Grey Cup finals. The CRU rule was that who ever gave up the fewest points between the winners of the WIFU and the IRFU finals would be eligible to play against the ORFU Champion in the Grey Cup. It was determined that the Ottawa Rough Riders gave up fewer points in the IRFU Finals - so they qualified for the Grey Cup.

+2 - Winnipeg Blue Bombers were not allowed to compete in the Grey Cup, because the CRU did not approve of the WIFU season being played under rules that varied from IRFU rules.

+3 - There was no WIFU regular season games, but the original three teams of the WIFU were playing in the Grey Cup playoffs.

See also
 See the N. J. Taylor Trophy to view champions from 1948–present.

References

Defunct Canadian Football League trophies and awards